Emilie Steffensen (born 22  May 2001) is a Danish handball player who plays for Nykøbing Falster Håndboldklub and the Danish national team.

She also represented Denmark in the 2017 European Women's U-17 Handball Championship, 2018 Women's Youth World Handball Championship, and in the 2019 Women's Junior European Handball Championship, placing 6th all three times.

Achievements 
Danish Women's Handball League:
Silver Medalist: 2019
Danish Cup:
Winner: 2019

References

2001 births
Living people
Danish female handball players
People from Ikast-Brande Municipality
Nykøbing Falster Håndboldklub players
Sportspeople from the Central Denmark Region